Novozymes A/S is a global biotechnology company headquartered in Bagsværd outside of Copenhagen, Denmark. The company's focus is the research, development and production of industrial enzymes, microorganisms, and biopharmaceutical ingredients.

The company has operations around the world, including in China, India, Brazil, Argentina, United Kingdom, the United States, and Canada.  Class B shares of its stock are listed on the NASDAQ OMX Nordic exchange.

History

In 1925, the brothers Harald and Thorvald Pedersen founded Novo Terapeutisk Laboratorium and Nordisk Insulinlaboratorium with the aim to produce insulin. In 1941 the company's predecessor launched its first enzyme, trypsin, extracted from the pancreas of animals and used to soften leather, and was the first to produce enzymes by fermentation using bacteria in the 1950s.  In the late 1980s Novozymes presented the world's first fat-splitting enzyme for detergents manufactured with genetically engineered microorganisms, called Lipolase.

The current Novozymes was founded in 2000 as a spinout from pharmaceutical company Novo Nordisk.

In the 2000s Novozymes expanded through the acquisition of several companies focusing on business outside the core enzyme business. Amongst them were the Brazilian bio agricultural company Turfal and German pharmaceutical, chemical and life science company EMD/Merck Crop BioScience Inc. These acquisitions made Novozymes a leader in sustainable solutions for the agricultural biological industry.

In January 2016, the company spun out its biopharmaceutical operations into Albumedix.

In June 2020, the business announced it would acquire Ireland-based PrecisionBiotics for $90 million. In December of the same year Novozymes announced it would acquire Microbiome Labs in a $125 million deal.

Ownership 
The Novozymes class A share capital is held by Novo Holdings A/S, a wholly owned subsidiary of the Novo Nordisk Foundation. In addition, Novo A/S holds 5,826,280 B shares, which overall gives Novo A/S 25.5% of the total share capital and 70.1% of the votes.

References

External links 
 
 
 Forbes Magazine: "100 Corporations That Will Survive 100 Years" (January 28, 2009)

Companies listed on Nasdaq Copenhagen
Biotechnology companies of Denmark
Life science companies based in Copenhagen
Companies based in Gladsaxe Municipality
Pharmaceutical companies established in 1925
Danish companies established in 2000
Danish brands
Biotechnology companies established in 1925
Yeast banks